The Border Legion is a 1918 American silent Western film directed by T. Hayes Hunter and starring Blanche Bates, Hobart Bosworth, and Eugene Strong. The film is based on the 1916 novel The Border Legion by Zane Grey. The film marked the screen debut of Blanche Bates. The Border Legion was released on August 28, 1918. Following the acquisition of distribution rights by Goldwyn Pictures, the film was rereleased in the United States on January 19, 1919. It is not known whether the film currently survives.

Plot
After Joan Randall (Blanche Bates) accuses her fiancé Jim Cleeve (Eugene Strong) of being a coward, he joins a gang of outlaws called the Border Legion. Feeling guilty about how she treated him, Joan follows after Jim and is soon attacked by gang leader Jack Kells (Hobart Bosworth), whom she shoots.

In the coming days, Joan nurses the outlaw back to health, earning his undying gratitude and a promise that he will always protect her. Later, when Jim reclaims her, Jack follows after the couple and threatens him. As the law closes in on the Border Legion, Jack tries to prevent the gang from using Joan as a hostage. During a confrontation, Jack is killed by his own gang. A posse soon arrives and save Joan and Jim.

Cast
 Blanche Bates as Joan Randall
 Hobart Bosworth as Jack Kells
 Eugene Strong as Jim Cleve
 Kewpie Morgan as Gorilla Gulden
 Russell Simpson as Overland Bradley
 Arthur Morrison as Sheriff Roberts
 Bull Montana as Red Pierce
 Richard Souzade as Bate Wood
 Kate Elmore as Mrs. Wood

Production
The Border Legion marked the film debut of stage actress Blanche Bates. The Border Legion was released on August 28, 1918. Following the acquisition of distribution rights by Goldwyn Pictures, the film was rereleased in the United States on January 19, 1919.

Critical response
The reviewer for the New York Times enjoyed the raw quality of the film:

Adaptations
Following this initial film adaptation of Zane Grey's novel The Border Legion, three additional film adaptations were produced by Paramount Pictures. In 1924, a second silent film, The Border Legion, was released, directed by William K. Howard and starring Antonio Moreno and Helene Chadwick. In 1930, the first sound film adaptation was directed by Otto Brower and Edwin H. Knopf, The Border Legion, starring Jack Holt and Fay Wray. Finally in 1934, The Last Round-Up was released, directed by Henry Hathaway and starring Randolph Scott and Barbara Fritchie.

References
Notes

Bibliography

External links

 
 
 lobby poster

1918 films
1918 Western (genre) films
Films based on works by Zane Grey
American black-and-white films
Films directed by T. Hayes Hunter
Films based on American novels
Silent American Western (genre) films
1910s American films
1910s English-language films